Foulden Common is a  biological Site of Special Scientific Interest east of Downham Market in Norfolk. It is a Nature Conservation Review site, Grade 2, and part of the Norfolk Valley Fens Special Area of Conservation.

This common has a mosaic of habitats, such as acidic and calcareous grassland, birch woodland, rich fen and open water. Flora in the fen grassland include purple moor-grass, black bog rush, purple small-reed and blunt-flowered rush.

There is limited public access to the common.

References

Sites of Special Scientific Interest in Norfolk
Special Areas of Conservation in England
Nature Conservation Review sites